Egyptian Second Division 2005-06 is the 2005-06 season of the Egyptian Second Division competition. A total of 40 teams are divided into groups based on geographical distribution. The top team of each group promotes to the highest Egyptian football level; Egyptian Premier League.

Changes before the season

Teams Relegated from 2004-05 Egyptian Premier Division 

  Baladeyet El-Mahalla 14th (Group B)
  Tersana 15th (Group A)
  Mansoura 16th (Group B)

Teams Promoted from 2004-05 Egyptian Third Division

Teams Promoted and Relegated after 2005-06 Egyptian Second Division

Teams Promoted to 2006-07 Egyptian Premier League 

Group A
  Petrojet
  Tersana

Group B
  El-Olympi
  Tanta FC

Group C
  Asyut Petroleum

Teams Relegated to 2006-07 Egyptian Third Division 

Group A

Group B

Group C

League tables

Promotion groups

Group A 

Top teams qualify for the 2006–07 Egyptian Premier League.
Bottom teams are relegated to

Group B 

Top teams qualify for the 2006–07 Egyptian Premier League.
Bottom teams are relegated to

Group C 

Top teams qualify for the 2006–07 Egyptian Premier League.
Bottom teams are relegated to

Relegation groups

Group A 

Top teams qualify for
Bottom teams are relegated to the Egyptian Third Division for the 2006–07 season.

Group B

Top teams qualify for
Bottom teams are relegated to the Egyptian Third Division for the 2006–07 season.

Group C

Top teams qualify for
Bottom teams are relegated to the Egyptian Third Division for the 2006–07 season.

Group D 

Top teams qualify for
Bottom teams are relegated to the Egyptian Third Division for the 2006–07 season.

References

External links
 The Egyptian Second Division Table
 RSSSF Second Level 2005/06
 all about Egyptian football
 All About Egyptian Players
 best site about egyptianfootball
 RSSSF competition history
 Egyptian Premier League schedule, match results, and match downloads 
 Filgoal.com Egyptian Premier League Live And It is very fast scoreboard 

Egyptian Second Division seasons
2005–06 in Egyptian football
Egypt